Milan Barényi (born 14 January 1974) is a Slovak cyclist, who specializes in cyclo-cross. He also competes on the road and in cross-country mountain biking.

Major results

Cyclo-cross

1998–99
 2nd National Cyclo-cross Championships
2003–04
 2nd National Cyclo-cross Championships
2004–05
 1st  National Cyclo-cross Championships
2005–06
 1st  National Cyclo-cross Championships
2006–07
 2nd National Cyclo-cross Championships
 3rd Grand Prix Ayuntamiento de Ispaster
2007–08
 1st  National Cyclo-cross Championships
2008–09
 1st  National Cyclo-cross Championships
 3rd Cyclo-cross International Podbrezová
2009–10
 1st Cyclo-cross International Podbrezová
2010–11
 2nd National Cyclo-cross Championships
2012–13
 3rd National Cyclo-cross Championships
2013–14
 2nd International Cyclocross Marikovská Dolina

Road

2009
 2nd Overall Tour du Cameroun
1st Stage 1
2010
 1st  Overall Tour du Cameroun
2011
 1st Stage 6 Tour of Guiana
2012
 5th Overall Tour du Cameroun
1st Stage 8
2013
 3rd National Time Trial Championships

Mountain bike

2005
 1st  National Cross-country Championships
2006
 1st  National Cross-country Championships
2008
 1st  National Cross-country Championships
 1st  National Cross-country Marathon Championships
2013
 2nd National Cross-country Championships

References

External links
 

1974 births
Living people
Sportspeople from Bojnice
Slovak male cyclists
Cyclo-cross cyclists
Cross-country mountain bikers